Joseph Michael Sempolinski (born February 10, 1983) is an American politician who served as the U.S. representative for  from 2022 to 2023. A Republican, he was first elected in a special election held on August 23, 2022.

Early life and education 
Born in Elmira, New York, Sempolinski graduated from Corning-Painted Post West High School in Painted Post, New York. He earned a Bachelor of Arts degree from Georgetown University and a Master of Arts and Master of Philosophy from Yale University.

Career 
Between 2010 and 2015, Sempolinski worked in the office of Congressman Tom Reed, including as District Director. A member of the Republican Party, he also serves as the Chairman of the Steuben County Republican Committee. At the time he was selected to run for Congress in 2022 New York's 23rd congressional district special election, he was serving as Chief of Staff in the office of New York State Assemblyman Joseph Giglio.

U.S. House of Representatives

Elections

2022 Special 

On May 10, 2022, Reed resigned from the seat representing New York's 23rd congressional district, a seat to which he had already stated he would not stand for re-election past 2022, leaving a vacancy in the  117th United States Congress. The boundaries of the district were to be redrawn according to the 2020 United States Census. Though two Republican candidates emerged for the newly redrawn district, former Buffalo School Board member Carl Paladino and eventual primary winner Nick Langworthy, both lived outside the bounds of the 23rd district as drawn at the time and decided not to seek the seat in the special election; the Republican county chairmen from the district selected Sempolinski to run for the seat in the special election.

Sempolinski defeated Max Della Pia, the Democratic nominee by a 53.1%–46.6% margin. He won 10 out of the 11 counties in the district, while Della Pia overwhelmingly won Tompkins County.

Tenure 
Sempolinski had pledged not to seek re-election in the November general election. He was sworn in immediately before Congress reconvened on September 13.

Committee assignments
On September 13, 2022, Sempolinski was assigned to the following committees:
United States House Committee on the Budget
United States House Committee on Education and Labor

References

External links 
 

|-

1983 births
21st-century American politicians
Living people
People from Steuben County, New York
Politicians from Elmira, New York
Republican Party members of the United States House of Representatives from New York (state)